Emmanuel Akot (born March 17, 1999) is a Canadian college basketball player for the Western Kentucky Hilltoppers of the Conference USA (C-USA). He previously played for the Arizona Wildcats and the Boise State Broncos.

High school career
Akot played for Kildonan-East Collegiate in Winnipeg, Manitoba, up until his sophomore season. While in Kansas for a tournament, Akot received an offer from Wasatch Academy. As a senior at Wasatch Academy, Akot averaged 17 points, seven rebounds and two assists per game. Akot was considered a five-star recruit by 247Sports and Rivals, and a four-star recruit by ESPN. In March 2017, Akot committed to playing college basketball for Arizona. He also received offers from Louisville, Oregon and Utah.

College career
As a freshman for Arizona, Akot played 31 games with four starts. He averaged 1.8 points and 1.1 rebounds per game of his freshman season. He continued his college career with Arizona for his sophomore season and averaged 3.8 points and 2.8 rebounds per game. Akot opted to transfer from Arizona forcing him to sit out the entirety of the 2019–20 season. In 2020, Akot transferred to Boise State. In his two seasons with the Broncos, Akot played in 54 games, starting 39 of them, while averaing 10.0 points and 3.3 rebounds per game.After playing 2 seasons for Boise State, Akot opted to transfer once again, this time to Memphis. However, Memphis would lose Akot, as he would instead transfer to Western Kentucky, where he still plays today.

Career statistics

College

|-
| style="text-align:left;"| 2017–18
| style="text-align:left;"| Arizona
| 31 || 4 || 10.4 || .389 || .375 || .455 || 1.1 || .8 || .2 || .1 || 1.8
|-
| style="text-align:left;"| 2018–19
| style="text-align:left;"| Arizona
| 17 || 11 || 19.3 || .394 || .286 || .400 || 2.8 || 1.1 || .2 || .1 || 3.8
|-
| style="text-align:left;"| 2019–20
| style="text-align:left;"| Boise State
| style="text-align:center;" colspan="11"|  Redshirt
|-
| style="text-align:left;"| 2020–21
| style="text-align:left;"| Boise State
| 23 || 10 || 25.5 || .389 || .333 || .633 || 3.6 || 2.7 || .8 || .5 || 9.1
|-
| style="text-align:left;"| 2021–22
| style="text-align:left;"| Boise State
| 31 || 29 || 31.8 || .400 || .387 || .590 || 3.1 || 2.8 || .7 || .4 || 10.6
|- class="sortbottom"
| style="text-align:center;" colspan="2"| Career
| 102 || 54 || 21.8 || .395 || .361 || .575 || 2.6 || 1.9 || .5 || .3 || 6.5

References

External links
Boise State Broncos bio
Arizona Wildcats bio

1999 births
Living people
Basketball players from Winnipeg
Canadian men's basketball players
Boise State Broncos men's basketball players
Canadian expatriate basketball people in the United States
Arizona Wildcats men's basketball players
Western Kentucky Hilltoppers basketball players
Shooting guards
Small forwards